School of Computing and Information Science Center of the Development for Information Technology (DIT).

The youngest School in Saint Louis University (SLU) traces its roots back to the vision of then Vice President for Finance and later University President, Rev. Fr. Ghisleen de Vos (1976–1983). Forward thinking and possessed with a progressive management style, Fr. de Vos foresaw the full automation of some university systems like the accounting and enrollment processes at a period when computerization was not yet widely practiced in the country. With the acquisition of the IBM systems in 1969 and in 1980, SLU also catered to the computing needs of other institutions in nearby regions.

The SLU Computer Center handled these tasks until 1990 when it evolved into the Institute of Information and Computing Science and offered a course in Computer Science. The institute was soon after converted into a college in 1994, and eventually the management of computing and IT needs of the different sectors of the university were devolved into the newly installed MIS and SLU NET Offices. Courses in Information Technology, Mathematics, Information Management, and Library and Information Science were added over time.

New as it was then, the school was already a trailblazer in IT education. The advanced curriculum was further strengthened with globe-spanning linkages, faculty scholarships and trainings, and invitation of international lecturers. The School hosted the first ever Northern Luzon international IT conference in 2007 with students, professionals and experts from the world over in attendance. It has since conducted annual regional IT congresses which showcase researches and projects in the field from different universities and industries.

This Center of Development in IT education continuously introduces program innovations to match current demands and skills in the profession. The School's ICT Research Laboratory designed and manages the University's Learning Management System, and the Research Digital Repository System which serve as online storehouse portals for course notes, researches, forums, and class records. The School has worked on and is currently completing studies on promising areas in IT research such as natural language processing using local dialects (e.g., Ilokano and Tagalog), computational mathematics and algorithm, mobile and wireless computing, and measurement of IT literacy and fluency.

People skilled in Digital Arts technology are among the most in-demand workers in several industries today. To meet this demand, and in support to the Philippine government’s call for HEIs to offer ladderized technical or vocational programs, the School offers short diploma courses in digital animation, multimedia systems, digital design, editing and publishing, and the like.

The latest addition to the School's graduate programs - the Masters of Science in Service Management Engineering (MSSME) - makes SLU the first in the country to offer this now trending academic initiative. The degree aims at advancing, managing, evaluating and optimizing systems in the global service industry. Developed in coordination with Prof. Dr. Guido Dedene, a renowned global IT expert, this course is a multidisciplinary program which also includes subjects from the Schools of Engineering and Architecture, and Accountancy and Business Management of SLU.

The School is distinguished to be one of the select HEIs tapped by the Philippine Statistical Research and Training Center as the focal place for regional trainings to accelerate statistical capability building in the nation.

Apart from producing technologically savvy professionals, the School wants to make itself socially relevant through the sharing of its expertise and resources. It donated numerous computer units in 2007 to the Baguio City National High School (BCNHS) as part of a collaborative project with the Close the Gap (CTG) alliance program of Belgium. As a component of the project, the School additionally designed and conducted a series of training programs for the teachers of the BCNHS on several computer and web-based applications.

The School's future looks bright as it continues to soar with the speed of rapid modernization. The School of Computing and Information and Sciences recognizes though that the power to create, command, and control information technology comes with great responsibility. The School therefore primes itself not only on setting new academic directions towards the advancement of IT and Computing education and research, but also on advocating the ethical use of information and computing

SLU was the first institutional internet service provider in Northern Luzon when it became a member - 1 of only 10 in the country then - of the Philippine Network Foundation (PHNet) consortium in 1994.

See also 

 Saint Louis University

References

Universities and colleges in Baguio